Château-d'Olonne is a former commune of the Vendée department in the Pays de la Loire region of Western France. On 1 January 2019, it was merged into the commune of Les Sables-d'Olonne.

References

Former communes of Vendée
Populated coastal places in France